Mandala House is a historic site located in Blantyre, Malawi. The building was formerly a residence built in 1882 by the African Lakes Corporation for their managers. The house is built in the colonial style and is wrapped by an encasing veranda. The site includes a garden on the property, and currently is a managed historical site that is home to the "Mandala Cafe", the "La Caverna" art gallery, and the main library and offices of the Society of Malawi, Historical and Scientific.

References

Residential buildings completed in 1882
Museums in Malawi